The 2006 Nationwide Tour season ran from January 26 to November 12. The season consisted of 31 official money golf tournaments, three of which were played outside the United States. The top 22 players on the year-end money list earned their PGA Tour card for 2007.

Schedule
The following table lists official events during the 2006 season.

Money leaders
For full rankings, see 2006 Nationwide Tour graduates.

The money list was based on prize money won during the season, calculated in U.S. dollars. The top 22 players on the tour earned status to play on the 2007 PGA Tour.

Awards

See also
2006 Nationwide Tour graduates

Notes

References

External links
Schedule at the Nationwide Tour's official site

Korn Ferry Tour seasons
Nationwide Tour